= Ugarkhod =

Coordinates: 15°38′N 74°46′E

- Village
- Interactive map of Ugarkhod
- Country: India
- State: Karnataka
- District: Belgaum

Languages
  - Official: Kannada
- Time zone: UTC+5:30 (IST)

Ugarkhod is a village in Belgaum district in the southern state of Karnataka, India.

Ugarkhod is located 21 kilometres (13 mi) from Bylahongal and 36 kilometres (22 mi) from Belgaum. It is 424 kilometres (263 mi) from the state's main city of Bangalore.
